Durham High School is a single-sex independent day school for girls aged 3 to 18 years old in Durham, United Kingdom.

History and current status
The school was founded in 1884 and has occupied various sites during its history. It now has premises south of the city at Farewell Hall. The school is a member of the Girls' Schools Association.

Durham High School was  judged as "Excellent" across all areas by the latest inspection carried out by the Independent Schools Inspectorate (ISI) in October 2022. The report highlighted pupils' "excellent" progress and achievement, their "outstanding" attitudes to learning and their "strong moral awareness".

Leadership and staff

The school is a Church of England foundation, whose current Principal is Simone Niblock. Mrs Niblock, who hails from Heywood in Lancashire, studied at both Oxford and Cambridge Universities. She has worked at girls' schools in Hertfordshire, Cheshire, Shropshire, Yorkshire and now Durham, where she arrived in September 2018.

Academic results
Academic results are higher than average, even for the independent sector. Government performance figures show 98% of students achieving 5 Grade A* - C grades or better in their General Certificates of Secondary Education. 

In 2022, 62.3% of GCSE entries achieved grade 9-7. At A Level 69.4% of the entries achieved A* or A.  Pupils invariably obtain a place at the University of their choice, including Oxford and Cambridge, and other Russell Group universities.

Scholarships
The school offers a number of scholarships and bursaries, including one which offers up to a 100% rebate on the fees for seven years. Scholarships and exhibitions in sport, music, drama and exam entrance awards are frequently awarded.

Notable former pupils

 Amy Tinkler - Olympic Bronze Medallist (Gymnastics) 
 Anne Williams - Church Army Captain and member of the General Synod of the Church of England
 Chantalle Edmunds - journalist
 Helen Bond, Professor of Christian Origins and Head of the School of Divinity, University of Edinburgh
 Joanna Burton - opera singer
 Mica McNeill - Olympian (bobsled)
 Sarah Gatenby - news presenter and journalist
 Wendy Craig - actress
 Wendy Gibson - actress and news presenter

References

Further reading

External links
 Durham High School for Girls website

Schools in Durham, England
Private schools in County Durham
Girls' schools in County Durham
Educational institutions established in 1894
Member schools of the Girls' Schools Association
1894 establishments in England